Saint-Amand-Villages is a commune in the department of Manche, northwestern France. The municipality was established on 1 January 2017 by merger of the former communes of Saint-Amand (the seat) and Placy-Montaigu.

See also 
Communes of the Manche department

References 

Communes of Manche